A list of Singaporean films released in Singapore in 2015:

Unscheduled releases
 Chennai Singapore - (Tamil)

References

2015
Films
Singapore